Sylvain Calzati (born 1 July 1979 in Lyon) is a former French road bicycle racer, who competed as a professional between 2003 and 2011. He also won the Tour de l'Avenir in 2004. He lives in Genay with his wife and daughter. He works as industrial cleaner.

Major results

2004
 1st, Overall, Tour de l'Avenir
 2nd, Overall, Étoile de Bessèges
 71st, Overall, Tour de France
2006
 1st, Stage 8, Tour de France (Saint-Méen-le-Grand to Lorient)

References

External links
Profile on AG2R Prévoyance website

Official Site

French male cyclists
French Tour de France stage winners
1979 births
Living people
French sportspeople of Italian descent
Cyclists from Lyon